Alvin Singleton (born December 28, 1940; Brooklyn, New York) is a composer from the United States. Born and raised in New York City, he received his music education from New York University (B.A.), studying with Hall Overton and Charles Wuorinen, and the Yale School of Music (M.M.), studying with Yehudi Wyner and Mel Powell.  With Fulbright Scholarships, he studied at the Saint Cecilia Academy in Rome with Goffredo Petrassi. From 1971 to 1985 he lived in Europe, and then he returned to the United States after being appointed as the Atlanta Symphony Orchestra resident composer, and served in that position from 1985-1988.  He served as a resident artist at Spelman College in Atlanta.  He was also a Rockefeller Foundation grantee in a series entitled "Meet the Composer."

Singleton's music shows the evidence of a wide range of influences -  "from Mahler to Monk, Bird to Bernstein, James Baldwin to Bach, Santana to Prince" - and often incorporates aspects of theatre and surprise. Notable are his set of eight Argoru pieces for various solo instruments, composed over the period from 1968 to 2002. His choral ballet TRUTH (2006), scored for mixed chorus, dancers and an ensemble of 10 instruments, is based on the life of human rights crusader Sojourner Truth. His piano concerto BluesKonzert had its Carnegie Hall debut in 2010 with soloist Ursula Oppens and the American Composers Orchestra.

Albany Records has issued a series of recordings, including Extensions of a Dream (2002, percussion music), Sing to the Sun (2007, choral and chamber music) and Sweet Chariot (2014, solo and chamber music). The Atlanta Symphony Orchestra and Chorus has recorded PraiseMaker. The four string quartets have been recorded by the Momenta Quartet.

List of compositions
A complete list of published compositions can be found on Alvin Singleton's website.
String Quartet No. 1 (1967)
Dream Sequence '76 (opera) (1976)
A Yellow Rose Petal for orchestra (1982)
After Fallen Crumbs for orchestra (1987)
Shadows for orchestra (1987)
 String Quartet No.2 Secret Desire to be Black (1988)
Between Sisters for soprano, alto flute, vibraphone and piano (1990)
 String Quartet No.3 Somehow We Can (1994)
BluesKonzert for piano and orchestra (1995)
PraiseMaker for mixed chorus and orchestra (1998)
 Greed Machine for vibraphone and piano (2003)
 When Given a Choice for orchestra (2004)
 TRUTH, choral ballet (2006)
 Brooklyn Bones for chorus and orchestra (2008)
 Different River for orchestra (2012)
 Sweet Chariot, for chamber ensemble (2013)
Prayer for tenor solo, chamber choir, organ, harp, trumpet, and cello (2016)
String Quartet No.4 Hallelujah Anyhow (2019)

References

Further reading
"Interview with Alvin Singleton". DO THE M@TH. 2016-09-30. Retrieved 2022-06-03. https://ethaniverson.com/interview-with-alvin-singleton/
"Darmstadt On Air #20: Singleton in Darmstadt Again". Internationales Musikinstitut Darmstadt. Retrieved 2022-06-03. https://internationales-musikinstitut.de/en/ferienkurse/onair/podcast20/
Wyatt, Lucius, and Alvin Singleton. “Alvin Singleton, Composer.” The Black Perspective in Music 11, no. 2 (1983): 178. https://doi.org/10.2307/1214912.

External links
Composer's website
Alvin Singleton interview from American Mavericks site
Finding aid to the Alvin Singleton archive at Columbia University. Rare Book & Manuscript Library.

1940 births
20th-century American composers
20th-century American male musicians
20th-century classical composers
21st-century American composers
21st-century American male musicians
21st-century classical composers
African-American classical composers
American classical composers
African-American male classical composers
African-American opera composers
American male classical composers
Living people
Male opera composers
New York University alumni
Spelman College faculty
Tzadik Records artists
Yale School of Music alumni
Members of the American Academy of Arts and Letters